Alan Buribayev (Alan Börıbaev; surname also spelled Buribaev in English) (born 30 May 1979) is a Kazakh orchestral conductor.

Career
The son of a cellist/conductor father and a pianist mother, he studied violin and conducting at the Kazakh National Conservatory in Almaty. He was later a conducting student of Uros Lajovic in Vienna. Buribayev won prizes in the International Competition of Young Conductors Lovro von Matačić in Zagreb and in the Antonio Pedrotti Competition in 2001.

Buribayev began his tenure as Principal Conductor of the Astana Symphony Orchestra, Kazakhstan, in March 2003, and had concluded his tenure by 2007. From 2004 to 2007, Buribayev was "Generalmusikdirektor" of the Meiningen Theatre, Germany. He became Principal Conductor of the Norrköping Symphony Orchestra in the 2007–2008 season, with an initial contract through 2010. He became chief conductor of Het Brabants Orkest in the Netherlands with the 2008–2009 season.

From 2010 to 2016, he was Principal Conductor of the RTÉ National Symphony Orchestra in Dublin, Ireland. Today he is Chief Conductor of the Astana Opera House and Principal Guest Conductor of the Japan Century Symphony Orchestra in Osaka.

References

External links
 IMG Artists agency biography of Alan Buribaev 
 French-language biography of Alan Buribaev

1979 births
Kazakhstani conductors (music)
Living people
21st-century conductors (music)